Mach may refer to Mach number, the speed of sound in local conditions. It may also refer to:

Computing
 Mach (kernel), an operating systems kernel technology
 ATI Mach, a 2D GPU chip by ATI
 GNU Mach, the microkernel upon which GNU Hurd is based
 mach, a computer program for building RPM packages in a chroot environment

Places
 Machh or Mach, a town in Pakistan
 Machynlleth or Mach, a town in Wales
 Mach (crater), a lunar crater
 3949 Mach, an asteroid

Other uses 
 Mach (surname)
 "Mach" (song), a 2010 song by Rainbow
 Mach (Transformers), a Multiforce character in Transformers: Victory
 M.A.C.H. (video game)
 Muscarinic acetylcholine receptor (mACh)
 Fly Castelluccio Mach, an Italian paramotor design
 Vietnamese mạch, an obsolete Vietnamese currency unit
 Hayato Sakurai or Mach (born 1975), mixed martial artist
 M.A.C.H., a fictional series of cyborg and robot agents in M.A.C.H. 1

See also

 Mac (disambiguation)
 Mach O (disambiguation)
 Mach 1 (disambiguation)
 Mach 2 (disambiguation)
 Mach 3 (disambiguation)
 Mach 4 (disambiguation)
 Mach 5 (disambiguation)
 Mach 6 (disambiguation)
 Mach 7 (disambiguation)
 Mach 8 (disambiguation)
 Mach 9 (disambiguation)
 Mach 10 (disambiguation)
 Mache (unit), an obsolete unit of volumic radioactivity 
 Mack (disambiguation)
 Mak (disambiguation)